America Tour 1996 (also known as the Nada Es Igual Tour) was a concert tour performed by Luis Miguel during the last part of 1996 to promote his last album Nada Es Igual. It only lasted for one month and it only took place at some places in South America, like Buenos Aires, Argentina in the River Plate Stadium, Santiago de Chile, Uruguay, Peru, Paraguay, Ecuador and Brazil.

This is mentioned to be the shortest tour ever made by the artist.

Set List 
This set list is from the December 7, 1996, concert in Buenos Aires. It does not represent all dates throughout the tour.

 "Dame Tú Amor"
 "Me Niego A Estar Solo"
 Up-tempo Medley:
"Un Hombre Busca Una Mujer" 
"Cuestión De Piel"
"Oro De Ley"
 Ballads Medley:
"Yo Que No Vivo Sin Ti"
"Culpable O No" 
"Mas Allá de Todo"
"Fría Como el Viento"
"Entrégate"
"Tengo Todo Excepto a Ti"
"La Incondicional"
 "Si Te Vas"
 "Hasta El Fin"
 "Always And Forever Intro" (Pat Metheny cover)
 "Todo y Nada"
 "No Sé Tú"
 "No Me Platiques Más"
 "La Barca"
 "Nosotros"
 "El Día Que Me Quieras"
 "Intro (Saxophone) - Que Nivel De Mujer"
 "Sueña"
 "Come Fly With Me" (feat. Frank Sinatra)
 "Dame"
 "La Media Vuelta"
 "Amanecí En Tus Brazos"
 "Si Nos Dejan"
 "Suave"
Encore
"Como Es Posible Que A Mi Lado" 
 "Será Que No Me Amas"

Tour dates

 The Santiago show was fully recorded for its partial transmission in Chile by Megavisión.
 The second Buenos Aires show was fully recorded for its transmission in Argentina by Telefe.''

Cancelled shows

Band
Vocals: Luis Miguel
Acoustic & Electric Guitar: Kiko Cibrian
Bass: Lalo Carrillo
Piano: Francisco Loyo
Keyboards: Arturo Pérez
Drums: Victor Loyo
Percussion: Tommy Aros
Saxophone: Jeff Nathanson
Saxophone: Cleto Escobedo
Trumpet: Francisco Abonce
Trombone: Alejandro Carballo
Trombone: Victor Potenza
Backing Vocals: Hannah Mancini, Sandra Allen

Notes

References

Luis Miguel concert tours
1996 concert tours